JavaScript templating refers to the client side data binding method implemented with the JavaScript language. This approach became popular thanks to JavaScript's increased use, its increase in client processing capabilities, and the trend to outsource computations to the client's web browser. Popular JavaScript templating libraries are AngularJS, Backbone.js, Ember.js, Handlebars.js, Vue.js and Mustache.js. A frequent practice is to use double curly brackets (i.e. {{key}}) to call values of the given key from data files, often JSON objects.

Examples 
All examples use an external file presidents.json with following contents
{
  "presidents" : [
      { "name": "Washington", "firstname": "George", "born": "1732", "death": "1799" },
      { "name": "Lincoln", "firstname": "Abraham", "born": "1809", "death": "1865" }
  ]
}

All examples will produce the following HTML list:

 Washington (1732-1799)
 Lincoln (1809-1865)

Templating becomes useful when the information distributed may change, is too large to be maintained in various HTML pages by available human resources and not large enough to require heavier server-side templating.

See also 
 Online JavaScript IDE
 Comparison of web template engines

References 
 
 
 
 
 
 http://www.jquery4u.com/javascript/10-javascript-jquery-templates-engines/
 

Template engines